Mr. Mugs is the title character in a series of children's books written by Martha Kambeitz and Carol Roth and published by Ginn and Company (now part of Prentice Hall). Mr. Mugs was an Old English Sheepdog who lived with two children, Pat and Cathy. These readers were used in Canadian elementary schools in the 1970s and early 1980s to teach reading. There were 3 different series (with seven levels within each series) of "Mr. Mugs" books: "Ginn Integrated Language Program"; "Light and Life Reading Series"; and "Sharing Points in Language Arts". While two titles were published in hardcover, the rest of the "Mr. Mugs" titles were published in softcover.

Series titles

Ginn Integrated Language Program
Books in this series are:
 What A Dog! (1968) G-07987 Level 1 - Book 1
 Meet My Pals (1968) CDEFG-07987654321 Level 1 - Book 2
 Take A Peek! (1968) DEFG-07987654321 Level 1 - Book 3
 Up The Beanstalk (1968) EFG-079876543 Level 2 - (Hardcover)
 Rockets Away! (1968) EFG-079876543 Level 3 - (Hardcover)
 All About Me! (1969) GHIJK-0798765 Level 4 - Book 1
 Mugs Scores! (1969) BCDE-079876543210 Level 4 - Book 2
 Carnival (1969) GHIJK-079876 Level 4 - Book 3
 Moon Shiny Night (1970) GHIJK-0798765 Level 5 - Book 1
 Higgleby's House (1970) GHIJK-0798765 Level 5 - Book 2
 Close-Up (1970) DE-0798765432 Level 5 - Book 3
 Bundle Of Sticks (1970) F-79876 Level 6 - Book 1 C-51200
 Topsy-Turvy (1970) E-7987654 Level 6 - Book 2 C-51210
 Taking Off! (1970) BCDE-7987654321 Level 6 - Book 3 C-51220
 Deep Sea Smile (1970) ABCDE-079876543210 Level 7 - Book 1 C-51235
 Detective Game (1970) BCDE-07987654321 Level 7 - Book 2 C-51245
 Catch A Firefly (1970) BCDE-07987654321 Level 7 - Book 3 C-51255

Light and Life Reading Series
Books in this series are:
 Meet Mr Mugs (1966) BCDEFG-0698 Level 1 - Book 1 C-64100
 Pals And Pets (1967) BCDEFG-0698 Level 1 - Book 2
 Peek In, Please! (1967) ABCDE-06987 Level 1 - Book 3
 Just For Fun (1967) DEFG-079876 Level 2 - (Hardcover)
 Blast Off! (1967) BCDEFG-069 Level 3 - (Hardcover)
 Ooops Splash! (1969) BCDE-079876543210 Level 4 - Book 1
 Pickety Fence (1969) ABCDE-069 Level 4 - Book 2
 Blackout (1969) CDE-079876543 Level 4 - Book 3
 Mugs Starts School (1969) CDE-079876543 Level 5 - Book 1
 Hamish Hampster (1969) ABCDE-069 Level 5 - Book 2
 In The Sun (1969) ABCDE-069 Level 5 - Book 3
 Something Wonderful! Level 6 - Book 1
 Singing Water (1970) BCDE-798765432 Level 6 - Book 2 C-64780
 Switch On The Night Level 6 - Book 3
 Fish Head Level 7 - Book 1
 Small Blue Bead Level 7 - Book 2
 Listening Tree (1970) ABCDE-079876543210 Level 7 - Book 3 C-64840

Starting Points in Language Arts
Books in this series are: (workbooks with ISBN are also listed)
 Mr. Mugs (1976)  Level 1 - Book 1 C-52300
 Mr. Mugs - A Jet-Pet (1976)  Level 1 - Book 2 C-52305
 Workbook - Level 1 (1976) -  C-52315
 Mr. Mugs Plays Ball (1976)  Level 2 - Book 1 C-52375
 Mr. Mugs And The Blue Whale (1976)  Level 2 - Book 2 C-52380
 Workbook - Level 2 (1976) -  C-52390
 First Prize for Mr. Mugs (1976)  Level 3 - Book 1 C-52410
 Mr. Mugs is Lost (1976)  Level 3 - Book 2 C-52415
 Workbook - Level 3 (1977) -  C-52425
 Sharing Time (1977)  Level 4 - Book 1 C-52450
 Happy Days for Mr. Mugs (1977)  Level 4 - Book 2 C-52455
 In A Dark Wood (1977)  Level 4 - Book 3 C-52460
 Workbook - Level 4 (1977) -  C-52470
 Mr. Mugs at School (1977)  Level 5 - Book 1 C-52485
 In The Rain (1977)  Level 5 - Book 2 C-52490
 Mr. Mugs to the Rescue (1977)  Level 5 - Book 3 C-52495
 Workbook - Level 5 (1978) -  C 52505
 Mr. Mugs is Kidnapped (1978)  Level 6 - Book 1 C-52520
 It's Saturday (1978)  Level 6 - Book 2 C-52525
 Feather Or Fur (1978)  Level 6 - Book 3 C-52530
 Workbook - Level 6 (1978) -  C-52540
 Just Beyond (1978)  Level 7 - Book 1 C-52555
 What If? (1978)  Level 7 - Book 2 C-52560
 The Secret Life of Mr. Mugs (1978)  Level 7 - Book 3 C-52565
 Workbook - Level 7 (1979) -  C-52575

External links
About Mr. Mugs at Old English Sheepdog
Preserving Mr. Mugs For All Eternity

Canadian children's books
Characters in children's literature
Learning to read